Cataulacus is a genus of ants in the subfamily Myrmicinae. The genus is distributed in the Paleotropical regions, mainly in the Afrotropics. Most species are found in forests, but a few are known from more open and arid habitats.

Species

Cataulacus adpressus Bolton, 1974
†Cataulacus anthracinus (Heer, 1849)
Cataulacus bequaerti Forel, 1913
Cataulacus boltoni Snelling, 1979
Cataulacus brevisetosus Forel, 1901
Cataulacus catuvolcus Bolton, 1974
Cataulacus centrurus Bolton, 1982
Cataulacus cestus Bolton, 1982
Cataulacus chapmani Bolton, 1974
Cataulacus difficilis Santschi, 1916
Cataulacus ebrardi Forel, 1886
Cataulacus egenus Santschi, 1911
Cataulacus elongatus Santschi, 1924
Cataulacus erinaceus Stitz, 1910
Cataulacus flagitiosus Smith, 1862
Cataulacus fricatidorsus Santschi, 1914
Cataulacus granulatus (Latreille, 1802)
Cataulacus greggi Bolton, 1974
Cataulacus guineensis Smith, 1853
Cataulacus hispidulus Smith, 1865
Cataulacus horridus Smith, 1857
Cataulacus huberi André, 1890
Cataulacus impressus Bolton, 1974
Cataulacus inermis Santschi, 1924
Cataulacus intrudens (Smith, 1876)
Cataulacus jacksoni Bolton, 1982
Cataulacus jeanneli Santschi, 1914
Cataulacus kenyensis Santschi, 1935
Cataulacus kohli Mayr, 1895
Cataulacus latissimus Emery, 1893
Cataulacus latus Forel, 1891
Cataulacus lobatus Mayr, 1895
Cataulacus longinodus Forel, 1912
Cataulacus lujae Forel, 1911
Cataulacus marginatus Bolton, 1974
Cataulacus mckeyi Snelling, 1979
Cataulacus micans Mayr, 1901
Cataulacus mocquerysi André, 1889
Cataulacus moloch Bolton, 1982
Cataulacus muticus Emery, 1889
Cataulacus nenassus Bolton, 1974
Cataulacus oberthueri Forel, 1891
Cataulacus pilosus Santschi, 1920
†Cataulacus planiceps Emery, 1891
†Cataulacus plebeius De Andrade & Baroni Urbani, 2004
Cataulacus pompom Snelling, 1979
Cataulacus porcatus Emery, 1899
Cataulacus praetextus Smith, 1867
Cataulacus pullus Santschi, 1910
Cataulacus pygmaeus André, 1890
Cataulacus regularis Forel, 1892
Cataulacus resinosus Viehmeyer, 1913
Cataulacus reticulatus Smith, 1857
Cataulacus satrap Bolton, 1982
Cataulacus setosus Smith, 1860
†Cataulacus silvestrii Emery, 1891
Cataulacus simoni Emery, 1893
Cataulacus striativentris Santschi, 1924
Cataulacus taprobanae Smith, 1853
Cataulacus tardus Santschi, 1914
Cataulacus taylori Bolton, 1982
Cataulacus tenuis Emery, 1899
Cataulacus theobromicola Santschi, 1939
Cataulacus traegaordhi Santschi, 1914
Cataulacus voeltzkowi Forel, 1907
Cataulacus vorticus Bolton, 1974
Cataulacus wasmanni Forel, 1897
Cataulacus weissi Santschi, 1913
Cataulacus wissmannii Forel, 1894

References

External links

Myrmicinae
Ant genera